The canton of Lot et Dourdou is an administrative division of the Aveyron department, southern France. It was created at the French canton reorganisation which came into effect in March 2015. Its seat is in Decazeville.

It consists of the following communes:
 
Almont-les-Junies
Boisse-Penchot
Conques-en-Rouergue
Decazeville
Flagnac
Livinhac-le-Haut
Saint-Félix-de-Lunel
Saint-Parthem
Saint-Santin
Sénergues
Viviez

References

Cantons of Aveyron